Danny Keogh (3 March 1948 – 23 July 2019) was a Ugandan-born South African actor known for his roles in South African television programs such as Known Gods, Interrogation Room, and Julius Galt in Charlie Jade.

He was born on 3 March 1948 in Kampala, Uganda.

Danny Keogh played King Dunchaid in the film Northmen: A Viking Saga.

Film

References

External links 
 
Labyrinth-tv.com Danny Keogh

20th-century South African male actors
1948 births
2019 deaths
Ugandan male television actors
South African male film actors
South African male television actors
White South African people
Ugandan people of British descent
People from Kampala